The 2001 Danish Figure Skating Championships was held in Aalborg from January 5 to 7, 2001. Skaters competed in the disciplines of men's singles and ladies' singles. Not all disciplines were held on all levels due to a lack of participants.

Senior results

Men

Ladies

External links
 results

Danish Figure Skating Championships
Danish Figure Skating Championships, 2001
Figure Skating Championships